Tuen is a locality in the Shire of Paroo, Queensland, Australia.

Geography 
The Warrego River flows from the north of the locality through to the south. The Mitchell Highway (also known as Barringun Road) runs roughly parallel and east of the river. Tuen Creek flows from the south-east of the locality and joins the Warrego River in roughly the centre of the locality; the highway crosses Tuen Creek near the confluence and at that spot is the undeveloped town of Tuen, a grid of 4 x 3 streets.

History 
The locality derives its name from Tuen Creek.

In April 1881, 57 town lots were offered for sale in the town of Tuen "at the junction of Warrego River and Tuen Creek" with prices starting from £8 per acre. Some lots were sold as 20 of them were owned by Margaret Heuston at her death in 1910. Her husband Robert Heuston operated the Tuen Hotel beside the Barringun Road until at least 1913, after which it may have been operated by the Gwydir family. In 1925, the hotel was taken over by retired policeman Robert Winterburn until at least 1934. There is no evidence the hotel was operating in the 1940s.

Today there is no visual evidence remaining of a town and no town is gazetted at that location.

References

External links

Shire of Paroo
Localities in Queensland